The yet-unnamed Powelliphanta species of amber snails is provisionally known as Powelliphanta "Urewera". It is an undescribed species of large, carnivorous land snail, a terrestrial pulmonate gastropod mollusc in the family Rhytididae.

Conservation status
Powelliphanta "Urewera" is classified in the New Zealand Threat Classification System as being Nationally Vulnerable.

References

 Powell A W B, New Zealand Mollusca, William Collins Publishers Ltd, Auckland, New Zealand 1979 
 Department of Conservation Recovery Plans
 New Zealand Department of Conservation Threatened Species Classification

Gastropods of New Zealand
Powelliphanta
Undescribed gastropod species
Endemic fauna of New Zealand
Endemic molluscs of New Zealand